The regional parliaments of Russia are the regional legislatures in the federal subjects of Russia (republics, krais, oblasts, autonomous oblasts and federal cities), which have different names but are often collectively referred to as regional parliaments.

The federal structure of Russia includes 85 regional parliaments. The largest regional parliament is the State Assembly of the Republic of Bashkortostan, which consists of 110 deputies, while the smallest one is the Duma of Chukotka Autonomous Okrug, which consists of 15 deputies. Currently, deputies in the regional parliaments are elected for five-year terms.

Names

Parties in each parliament 

Data is current as of December 2020.

United Russia holds an absolute majority in 79 of the 85 parliaments.

The Table is not yet updated to the 2022 Russian regional elections.

a.  Not recognized internationally as a part of Russia, but part of Ukraine.

See also 
 Politics of Russia

References

Government of Russia